The OMTAS (Orta Menzilli Tanksavar Sistemi), also known as Mızrak-O, is a Turkish medium range anti-tank guided missile developed by Roketsan. OMTAS is an advanced system with various types of latest technologies, effective against modern armored threats on the battlefield. OMTAS is likely to replace current 152 mm BGM-71 TOW and 103 mm MILAN in Turkish service.

Overview
The OMTAS weapon system is a combination of missile, missile launching platform with fire control unit, carrying cases, and training simulator. It intended to destroy stationary and moving armored targets. Firing can occur from a tripod mount, vehicle, stabilized land platform, or remote controlled turret. The missile has two types of selectable warhead to use, tandem-charge high-explosive anti-tank (HEAT) and high explosive (HE) fragmentation. The tandem HEAT warhead is designed to counter the armor of modern main battle tanks and HE fragmentation warhead to attack infantry positions and light or non-armored vehicles. The system can use a thermographic camera sight.

OMTAS features day and night all-weather abilities, direct attack and top attack modes, switching targets during flight, fire-behind-mask, fire-and-forget, and fire-and-update modes. The impact point on a target can be updated during flight. OMTAS's uncooled imaging infrared (IIR) seeker  is supplied by another Turkish defense company Aselsan. Actual armor penetration of the tandem-charge HEAT warhead is still classified but it can be assumed that it is not less than 1000 mm behind explosive reactive armor (ERA) and could be more deadly with its wider 160 mm diameter. , OMTAS is the largest top attack missile developed by a NATO member state.

Operators
 Turkish Land Forces

References

Anti-tank guided missiles
Anti-tank guided missiles of Turkey
Air-to-surface missiles of Turkey
Roketsan products
Military equipment introduced in the 2010s